Acayip Hikayeler (Strange Stories) is a fantastic-fiction TV show which is adapted from Galip Tekin's comics. Its first episode was aired on 13 April 2013 on Star TV.

Hayko Cepkin narrates every episode and every episode the cast and plot changes. Every episode begins and ends with Hayko Cepkin's "judgment". In starting judgment Hayko Cepkin implies what is the story about and in ending judgement he simply tells the moral of the story and sometimes gives advice.

The show's 11th and last episode was aired on 22 June 2012 AS "season final" but later Star TV announced this was the final episode and removed from air.

Cast 

Haluk Bilginer, Şevval Sam, Fulden Akyürek, Ayta Sözeri, Hayko Cepkin
Begüm Akkaya, Altan Erkekli, Ozan Bilen, Hayko Cepkin
Cem Özer, Erkan Meriç, Hayko Cepkin
Irmak Ünal, Kaan Urgancıoğlu, Selen Domaç, Hayko Cepkin
Payidar Tüfekçioğlu, Tamer Karadağlı, Hayko Cepkin
Levent Üzümcü, Yeşim Büber, Murat Karasu, Hayko Cepkin
İdil Fırat, Jess Molho, Galip Tekin, Hayko Cepkin
, Orhan Aydın, Bülent Polat, Billur Kalkavan, Hayko Cepkin
Ayla Arslancan, Can Kolukısa, Mehtap Anıl, Hayko Cepkin
Bülent Polat, Ferdi Sancar, Hayko Cepkin
Özlem Tekin, Levent Güner, Hayko Cepkin

2013 Turkish television series debuts